League table for teams participating in Ykkönen, the second tier of the Finnish Soccer League system, in 1987.

League table

Promotion/relegation playoff

GrIFK Kauniainen - KePS Kemi  0-2
KePS Kemi - GrIFK Kauniainen  5-2

KePS Kemi stayed in Premier Division.

See also
Mestaruussarja (Tier 1)

References

Ykkönen seasons
2
Fin
Fin